The Church of St. Demetrius is a Serbian Orthodox church in Dalj in eastern Croatia, and the cathedral of the Eparchy of Osječko polje and Baranja. The first church on this site was built in 1715, and the present-day church in 1799. The church of St. Demetrius is the largest cathedral of the Serbian Orthodox Church in Croatia.

Name
The church is dedicated to and named after Demetrius of Thessaloniki, a Christian martyr who lived in the early 4th century. During the Middle Ages, he came to be revered as one of the most important Orthodox military saints, often paired with Saint George. His feast day is 26 October for Christians following the Gregorian calendar and 8 November for Christians following the Julian calendar.

Architecture
The height of church bell tower is 50 metres, church width is 16 metres and length 36 metres.

History
On the site of the present-day church, which was built in 1799, stood an older wooden church which was often the case with Orthodox churches in eastern Croatia. At the site of the wooden church in 1715 was built the first church made of solid material. Construction of the current church began in 1791.

The church's iconostasis was completed in 1824 and the church consecrated in 1840. The church has been renovated in its history several times, in 1837, 1866, 1901, 1931, 1949 and 2004.

The church was badly damaged during World War II by the actions of the Ustaše authorities of Independent State of Croatia and closed on 12 July 1941. The church bells were then removed, the iconostasis demolished (although most of the icons survived), the roof tiles removed, the tower dynamited and parts of the church walls destroyed.

Patriarchal palace

Next to the church is the Patriarchal palace, one of the summer residences of the Serbian Patriarchs.

See also
Eparchy of Osječko polje and Baranja
Dalj
Serbs of Croatia
List of Serbian Orthodox churches in Croatia

References

Dalj
18th-century Serbian Orthodox church buildings
Destroyed churches in Croatia
Rebuilt churches
Rebuilt buildings and structures in Croatia
Buildings and structures demolished in 1941